TAC – Empresa de Transportes Aéreos Catarinense S/A was a Brazilian airline founded in 1947 that operated mainly in the south and southeast regions of Brazil. It was absorbed by Cruzeiro do Sul in 1966.

History 
TAC was founded in December 1947 in Rio de Janeiro, Brazil with the name TAL – Transportes Aéreos Ltda. Its operations started in May of the following year, linking Rio de Janeiro and Curitiba. In August 1950 the name was changed to TAC and the headquarters to Florianópolis, from where it built a network of services linking Florianópolis and cities of the state of Santa Catarina to Curitiba and Rio de Janeiro to the north, and Porto Alegre to the south. In 1956 it operated to 11 cities.

Around this time an operational agreement was signed with Cruzeiro do Sul in which TAC operated as some sort of feeder to the services of Cruzeiro do Sul. On January 1, 1966, TAC was bought and merged into Cruzeiro do Sul.

Destinations 
In 1957 TAC operated to the following states and cities in south and southeast Brazil:

 Chapecó – Serafin Enoss Bertaso Airport
 Curitiba – Afonso Pena International Airport
 Florianópolis – Hercílio Luz International Airport
 Itajaí
 Joaçaba – Santa Terezinha Airport
 Joinville – Lauro Carneiro de Loyola Airport
 Lages
 Paranaguá
 Porto Alegre – Salgado Filho International Airport
 Rio de Janeiro – Santos Dumont Airport
 Santos
 Videira – Ângelo Ponzoni Airport

Fleet

See also
List of defunct airlines of Brazil

References

External links 
 TAC accidents as per Aviation Safety Network
 Timetable image for TAC (1957) - included in the network of Cruzeiro do Sul

Defunct airlines of Brazil
Airlines established in 1947
Airlines disestablished in 1966
1966 disestablishments in Brazil
Brazilian companies established in 1947